The list of ship launches in 1790 includes a chronological list of some ships launched in 1790.


References

1790
Ship launches